Constitución de 1917 is a terminal station at the southeastern end of line 8 of the Mexico City Metro in Mexico City, Mexico.
 In 2019, the station had an average ridership of 100,043 passengers per day, making it the fourth busiest station in the network.

The logo of the station depicts a quill above a document dated 1917 and is intended to represent the Constitution of Mexico, which was adopted 5 February 1917.  The station was opened on 20 July 1994.

Ridership

References

External links 
 

Mexico City Metro Line 8 stations
Mexico City Metro stations in Iztapalapa
Railway stations opened in 1994
1994 establishments in Mexico
Accessible Mexico City Metro stations